= Tómnat =

Tómnat was an Irish language feminine given name used during the medieval period.

== People ==
- Tómnat bean Ferchair, died 695.
